Wisse is a Dutch given name and patronymic surname. The given name may come via "Wiso" from the Germanic root -wisu-, meaning "good". The surname "van Wisse" is a Dutch toponymic surname and has a separate origin.

Given name
Wisse Dekker (1924-2012), Dutch businessman
Wisse Alfred Pierre Smit (1903–1986), Dutch poet and historian

Surname
Donovan Wisse (born 1997), Surinamese kickboxer
Mabel Wisse Smit (born 1968), widow of Prince Friso of Orange-Nassau
Ruth Wisse (born 1936), writer and academic
Yvonne Wisse (born 1982), Dutch heptathlete
Van Wisse
Robert Francis Van Wisse (born 1965), American criminal 
Tammy van Wisse (born 1968), Australian long-distance swimmer

See also
Ancrene Wisse, a monastic manual for female anchorites

References

Dutch masculine given names
Dutch-language surnames
Patronymic surnames